The Danish ironclad Odin was a central battery ironclad built for the Royal Danish Navy in the 1870s. She was scrapped in 1912.

Description
Her crew consisted of 206 officers and enlisted men. She was fitted with a retractable spur ram in the bow. The ship was reconstruction in 1898 to give her main guns better arcs of fire and an armored conning tower was added.

Odin had one horizontal direct-acting steam engine, built by Burmeister & Wain, that drove a single propeller shaft.

She was initially armed with four single Armstrong  rifled muzzle-loading (RML) guns mounted in the armored citadel and six  guns. In 1883, the 76-millimeter guns were replaced by four  rifled breech-loading guns. The 254-millimeter guns were later converted into 16-caliber breech-loading guns by Krupp.

The battery was protected by  armor plates.

Construction and career
Odin, named for the eponymous god from Norse legend, was laid down by the Naval Dockyard in Copenhagen on 13 April 1871, launched on 12 December 1872 and completed on 7 September 1874. She was stricken from the Navy List on 12 June 1912 and sold for scrap. The ship was broken up in the Netherlands.

Notes

References
 
 
 

Coastal defence ships of the Royal Danish Navy
Ironclad warships of the Royal Danish Navy
1872 ships
Ships built in Copenhagen